Lacrimispora celerecrescens is a bacterium from the genus Lacrimispora.

References

Further reading
 
 

 

Bacteria described in 1989
Lachnospiraceae